Agastus is a genus of beetles in the family Carabidae, containing the following species:

 Agastus alternatus (Basilewsky, 1962)
 Agastus biseriatus Baehr, 1987
 Agastus congoanus (Basilewsky, 1960)
 Agastus fuscatus (Liebke, 1937)
 Agastus gabonicus (Mateu, 1970)
 Agastus hirsutus Baehr, 1985
 Agastus kivuanus (Basilewsky, 1960)
 Agastus lineatus Schmidt-Goebel, 1846
 Agastus ustulatus Gestro, 1875
 Agastus zuphoides (Alluaud, 1931)

References

Dryptinae